A badminton tournament was held at the  1997 Southeast Asian Games in Asia-Africa hall at the Senayan sports complex, Jakarta from 12 to 18 October 1997. Both men and women competed in their own team, singles, and doubles events and together they competed in a mixed doubles event. There was also a playoff between the two semifinal losers to determine the sole winner of the bronze medal.

Medalists

Results

Men's team

Quarter-final

Semi-final

Bronze-medal match

Gold-medal match

Women's team

Quarter-final

Semi-final

Bronze-medal match

Gold-medal match

Men's singles

Women's singles

Men's doubles

Women's doubles

Mixed doubles

Medal tally
Legend

References

1997
1997 in badminton
1997 Southeast Asian Games
Southeast Asian Games, 1997